Nathalie Martin is the Frederick M. Hart Chair in Consumer and Clinical Law at the University of New Mexico School of Law. She is a member of the American Law Institute and the American College of Bankruptcy as well as a former resident scholar at the American Bankruptcy Institute and a former dean of faculty of the American Board of Certification, which writes the tests used to certify bankruptcy attorneys.  She is also a regular contributor to Credit Slips, a blog on debtor creditor issues.

Her research focuses on payday, title, and installment loan products with triple digit interest rates. She also does empirical research in  consumer attitudes toward credit, and consumer knowledge of various credit products, and in the credit habits of undocumented persons. Her projects include several empirical studies funded by the National Conference of Bankruptcy Judges, including one that funded curbside interviews of payday loan customers.

She runs the Financial Literacy Program at UNM School of Law, promoting financial literacy in New Mexico high schools, and teaches a two-day Financial Literacy Course for law students and undergraduates.

References 

Year of birth missing (living people)
Living people
University of New Mexico faculty
American legal scholars